St Albans High School for Girls is a selective, private day school for girls aged 4 – 18 years, which is affiliated to the Church of England and takes girls of all faiths or none. There are approximately 328 pupils in the preparatory school with 900 in the senior school and 186 sixth formers.

History
Founded in 1889, the high school has close links with the Diocese of St Albans through the bishop, who is visitor to the school, and the dean, who is honorary vice-chair of the governing body. The high school moved from its original site on Holywell Hill to its current location on Townsend Avenue in 1908. The preparatory school took up residence at Wheathampstead House in 2003.

Founders' Day is the school's annual celebration of its beginnings. Old Girls, governors and other members of the school community are invited to a dedicated service in the cathedral and Abbey Church of St Alban to commemorate the founders with current students and staff.

Preparatory school
The preparatory school, St Albans High School Prep, is situated in 18 acres of parkland in the village location of Wheathampstead. The extensive site includes play areas, an adventure playground, woods and an outdoor learning classroom. There is an extensive range of extra-curricular activities.

Senior school
The senior school and sixth form is in St Albans and facilities include an indoor swimming pool and fitness suite, a dedicated music school, Ringwood and a new performing arts centre and design & technology block. The school’s large playing fields include tennis courts, lacrosse pitches and a new sports pavilion. Sixth formers also have exclusive access to the onsite Starbucks style cafe. Pupils are prepared for GCSE and IGCSE examinations at the age of 16, for A Level examinations, for Oxford and Cambridge entrance and for the examinations of the Associated Board of the Royal Schools of Music along with Trinity Guildhall. Girls throughout the school have the opportunity to take speech and drama lessons in small groups in preparation for a variety of LAMDA examinations.

House system

At St Albans High School there are 4 houses:
 Julian 
 Named after: Lady Juliana Berners, a 15th-century prioress of Sopwell Nunnery, famous for her learning
 Colour: red
 Mascot: raven
 Paris 
 Named after: Matthew Paris, a monk of St Albans Abbey in the 13th century and well known for his chronicle of local events
 Colour: blue
 Mascot: fleur-de-lis
 Mandeville 
 Named after: Sir John Mandeville, associated with a book of travels in the 14th century
 Colour: green
 Mascot: dragon
 Verulam 
 Named after: Sir Francis Bacon, first Earl of Verulam, philosopher and writer
 Colour: yellow
 Mascot: lamp

Notable alumni

 Rimla Akhtar, businesswoman and champion of inclusivity in sport
 Anne Buck (1910–2005), cultural historian and curator of dress
 Helen Ekins, horticulturalist
 Tristia Harrison, CEO TalkTalk
 Jane Hawking, author and academic
 Stephen Hawking was educated at the school between 1950-1953. Then, unlike today, boys were educated at the school until the age of ten.
 Anna Neagle, stage and film actress
 Claire Horwell, professor of geohealth

Notes and references

 

Girls' schools in Hertfordshire
Private schools in Hertfordshire
Educational institutions established in 1889
1889 establishments in England
Schools in St Albans
Member schools of the Girls' Schools Association